Abano may refer to:
Pietro d'Abano (c.1257 – 1315), Italian philosopher, astrologer and professor of medicine 
Abano Glacier, a glacier in Georgia
Abano (Kareli municipality), a village in Kareli municipality, Georgia 
Abano (Kazbegi municipality), a village in Kazbegi municipality, Georgia
Abano Pass, a mountain pass in Georgia
Abano Terme, a town and comune in the Padua province of Italy